James Karl Bartleman  (born 24 December 1939) is a former Canadian diplomat and author who served as the 27th Lieutenant Governor of Ontario from 2002 to 2007.

Bartleman grew up in the Muskoka town of Port Carling, and he is a member of the Chippewas of Mnjikaning First Nation. In 1963, he earned a Bachelor of Arts degree (BA) in History from the University of Western Ontario, where he was initiated as a member of Phi Delta Theta.

From 2007 to 2012, Bartleman was the Chancellor of the Ontario College of Art and Design (OCAD) in Toronto.

Foreign service career
Prior to taking on the role of lieutenant governor, Bartleman had a distinguished career of more than 35 years in the Canadian foreign service. He began his diplomatic career in what was then known as the Department of External Affairs (now Global Affairs Canada) in 1967. In 1972, he was given the task of opening Canada's first diplomatic mission in the newly independent People's Republic of Bangladesh. Bartleman also served in diplomatic posting in Columbia. He was then made Canada's ambassador to Cuba (Havana) from 1981 to 1983.  Upon his return from Cuba, he was appointed as director of security and intelligence for the Department of External Affairs. After this, Bartleman served as High Commissioner to Cyprus and Ambassador to Israel (Tel Aviv) simultaneously from 1986 to 1990.  From the dual posting he moved to post of Canadian Ambassador to the North Atlantic Council of the North Atlantic Treaty Organization (NATO) in Brussels, Belgium from 1990 to 1994.  He was moved from NATO to the Commonwealth of Nations positions as High Commissioner to South Africa (Pretoria) in 1998-1999 and to Australia (Canberra) in 1999–2000.  Finally, he was transferred back to Europe to serve as ambassador to the European Union in Brussels, Belgium, from 2000 to 2002.

Bartleman was director of security and intelligence for the Department of External Affairs at the time of the Air India Bombing. On 3 May 2007, he testified at the Air India Inquiry that he had presented an intelligence document to the RCMP warning of a possible attack days prior to the bombing. Bob Rae, who had been tasked with advising deputy PM Anne McLellan, later admitted that he never bothered to interview Bartleman, the former head of intelligence for Foreign Affairs Canada.

Lieutenant-Governor of Ontario
Bartleman was sworn in as the 27th Lieutenant Governor of Ontario on 7 March 2002 as Ontario's 41st Vice-regal representative (27th since confederation, 41st since the establishment of the post in 1792).

As is traditional to a vice-regal appointment, Bartleman used his position to spearhead three initiatives that he personally identifies with and considers important.  During his mandate as Lieutenant Governor, he sought to:
 Reduce the stigma of mental illness;
 Fight racism and discrimination;
 Promote literacy among First Nations children.

To these ends, he initiated the Lieutenant Governor's Book Program in 2004.  He has collected over 1.2 million books, donated from all corners of the province from both institutions and individuals, to stock school libraries in First Nations communities, particularly in Northern Ontario. In 2005, to further promote literacy and bridge building, Bartleman initiated a program to pair up Native and non-Native schools in Ontario and Nunavut, and set-up summer camps for literacy development in five northern First Nations communities.

Personal

Bartleman is related to honorary Chief of the Mnjikaning Indians John Bigwin from his mother's side.

Writing
Bartleman published several works of non-fiction, both before and during his viceregal term. These included the childhood memoirs Out of Muskoka (2002) and Raisin Wine: A Boyhood in a Different Muskoka (2007), and the professional career memoirs On Six Continents (2004) and Rollercoaster: My Hectic Years as Jean Chrétien's Diplomatic Advisor (2005).

Following the end of his viceregal term, Bartleman has also published a trilogy of social justice novels, As Long as the Rivers Flow (2011), The Redemption of Oscar Wolf (2013) and Exceptional Circumstances (2015). As Long as the Rivers Flow was a finalist for the 2013 Burt Award for First Nations, Métis and Inuit Literature.

Honours

Orders and awards
 Bartleman was awarded the National Aboriginal Achievement Award (now the Indspire Award) for public service in 1999
 On 1 June 2002, as Lieutenant-Governor, he received the Order of Ontario and became the Order's Chancellor
 On 1 June 2002, he was invested as a Knight of Justice in the Order of St. John
 In 2002, he received the Canadian version of the Queen Elizabeth II Golden Jubilee Medal
 On 25 January 2008, he received the Rotary Youth Impact Award for Lifetime Achievement from the Rotary Club of Toronto West
 In 2011, he was made an Officer of the Order of Canada "for his contributions to his country, notably as lieutenant governor, and as a champion of mental health, literacy and poverty reduction."
 In 2012, he received the Canadian version of the Queen Elizabeth II Diamond Jubilee Medal
 The Dr. Hugh Lefave Award
 The Courage to Come Back Award
 The Deloitte Hero Inspiration Award
 The Jane Chamberlin Award for his efforts to reduce the stigma of mental illness
 The Phi Delta Kappa Educator of the Year Award
 The DAREarts Cultural Award in recognition of the Lieutenant Governor's Book Program

Honorary degrees
Bartleman has been awarded many honorary degrees for his service, including the following:

Honorific eponyms
Awards
  Ontario: James Bartleman Aboriginal Youth Creative Writing Awards

Bibliography
 Out of Muskoka (2002)
 On Six Continents (2004)
 Rollercoaster: My Hectic Years as Jean Chrétien's Diplomatic Advisor (2005)
 Raisin Wine: A Boyhood in a Different Muskoka (2007)
 As Long as the Rivers Flow (2011)
 The Redemption of Oscar Wolf (2013)
 Exceptional Circumstances (2015)
 Seasons of Hope (2016)
 A Matter of Conscience (2018)

See also
 The Canadian Crown and Aboriginal peoples
 List of Canadian university leaders

References

External links
Lieutenant-Governor of Ontario Official Site
Vice-regal Badge of Service
James Bartleman on The Hour
Bartleman, James K. at The Canadian Encyclopedia
 Foreign Affairs and International Trade Canada Complete List of Posts 

1939 births
Living people
Canadian autobiographers
First Nations politicians
First Nations novelists
Knights of Justice of the Order of St John
Lieutenant Governors of Ontario
Members of the Order of Ontario
People from the District Municipality of Muskoka
Writers from Ontario
University of Western Ontario alumni
Ojibwe people
Officers of the Order of Canada
People from Orillia
Ambassadors of Canada to the European Union
Permanent Representatives of Canada to NATO
Ambassadors of Canada to Cuba
Ambassadors of Canada to Israel
High Commissioners of Canada to South Africa
High Commissioners of Canada to Mauritius
High Commissioners of Canada to Namibia
High Commissioners of Canada to the Solomon Islands
High Commissioners of Canada to Eswatini
High Commissioners of Canada to Lesotho
Ambassadors of Canada to Palau
High Commissioners of Canada to Nauru
High Commissioners of Canada to Australia
Ambassadors of Canada to the Marshall Islands
Ambassadors of Canada to the Federated States of Micronesia
21st-century Canadian novelists
Canadian male novelists
Canadian writers of young adult literature
Indspire Awards
21st-century Canadian male writers
21st-century First Nations writers
Canadian male non-fiction writers
Chancellors of OCAD University